Land of Legends, Centre for Historical-Archaeological Research and Communication (Danish: Sagnlandet Lejre) is a 106-acre (43 hectare) archaeological open-air museum situated in the Lejre Municipality, few kilometres west of Roskilde, Denmark.

History
Lejre Land of Legends was formerly known as Centre for Historical-Archaeological Research and Communication (Historisk-arkæologisk Forsøgscenter). It was founded in 1964 by ethnologist  Hans-Ole Hansen  to create new knowledge of the past through experiments. On March 1, 2009, Lejre Experiment Centre changed its name to Sagnlandet Lejre.

The site comprises reconstructions of an Iron Age village and sacrificial bog (200 BC to 200 AD), a Viking market place (900 AD), a Stone Age campsite (5000 BC), an 18th-century farmstead and various grave monuments. The historical artisan workshops (pottery, weaver's workshop, smithy) work to reproduce  pre-historical handicraft. Gardens, pastures and fields are the natural scenario of activities and reconstructions.

Lejre researchers have re-created ancient crafts. Researchers have also explored in detail the ancient methods of food production. Activities for the public utilizes previous techniques, known from historical documents, archaeological evidence or experimental archaeology.

Many archaeologists from all over the world come to Lejre to perform their experiments, dealing with a broad variety of subjects and artifacts.  Lejre has also supported the experimental work of Errett Callahan (1937–2019) who was one of the world's most recognised flintknappers.

Around 55,000 tourists and school children visit Lejre each year.
Each summer many families spend a week of their holidays in the Iron Age village, the farm cottages and the Stone Age campsite. They dress in period costume and take on the role of peopling the reconstructed areas, while trying to live using the techniques of the past.

See also 
Middelaldercentret
 Experimental archaeology

References

External links
Sagnlandet Lejre official website 

1964 establishments in Denmark
Education in Denmark
Open-air museums in Denmark
Museums in Region Zealand
Archaeological museums in Denmark
Living museums
Experimental archaeology
Classical reenactment
Viking Age museums